Thibault Vinçon (born 15 July 1976) is a French film and theater actor.

He studied at the French National Academy of Dramatic Arts in Paris.

Selected filmography

Film
 2004: Le Dernier Jour directed by Rodolphe Marconi (English title: The Last Day) 
 2006: Poison Friends directed by Emmanuel Bourdieu
 2007: La Vie d'artiste directed by Marc Fitoussi
 2007: Primrose Hill directed by Mikhael Hers
 2007: Les Deux Mondes directed by Daniel Cohen (English title: Two Worlds)
 2008: Un cœur simple directed by Marion Laine (English title: A Simple Heart)
 2008: Nés en 68 directed by Olivier Ducastel and Jacques Martineau (English title: Born in 68)
 2009: Noir océan directed by Marion Hänsel
 2010: Memory Lane directed by Mikhaël Hers
 2010: Le Sentiment de la chair directed by Roberto Garzelli
 2011: Le Roman de ma femme directed by Jamshed Usmonov (English title: My Wife's Romance)
 2012: Cornouaille directed by Anne Le Ny
 2013: Le verrou directed by Laurent Laffargue (short film)
 2013: Une autre vie directed by Emmanuel Mouret (English title: Another Life)
 2014: Le souffleur de l'Affaire directed by Isabelle Prim
 2015: Un homme idéal directed by Yann Gozlan (English title: A Perfect Man)
 2016: Ce sentiment de l'été directed by Mikhaël Hers (English title: This Summer Feeling)
 2016: Trip directed by Pascal Stervinou

Television 
 2002: Joséphine, ange gardien (TV Series / 1 Episode), directed by Stéphane Kurc (role : Alexis)
 2009: L'École du pouvoir (miniseries) directed by Raoul Peck (role: Matt Ribeiro)
 2009: Les Héritières directed by Harry Cleven
 2009: Sous un autre jour directed by Alain Tasma
 2013: Drumont, histoire d'un antisémite français, historical television movie by Emmanuel Bourdieu
 2014: Meurtre à Pacot directed by Raoul Peck (English title: Murder in Pacot)
 2016: Innocente directed by Lionel Bailliu

 Theatre 
 2010: Lorenzaccio directed by Claudia Stavisky, at Théâtre des Célestins
 2011: Le Dragon d'Or directed by Claudia Stavisky, at Théâtre des Céléstins
 2012: Le Bourgeois gentilhomme directed by Denis Podalydès, at Théâtre des Bouffes du Nord
 2013: Les Criminels directed by Richard Brunel, at Théâtre de la Colline
 2014: Steve V king different directed by Roland Auzet, at Opéra de Lyon / Théâtre de la Renaissance
 2015: Un fils de notre temps directed by Simon Delétang, at Théâtre des Célestins
 2016: Roberto Zucco directed by Richard Brunel, at TGP
 2016 - 2017: Le Bourgeois gentilhomme directed by Denis Podalydès, at the Théâtre des Bouffes du Nord

 Awards and nominations 
 Étoile d'or de la révélation masculine for his role in the film Les Amitiés maléfiques'', directed by Emmanuel Bourdieu (2007)

References

External links 

Living people
1977 births
French male film actors
French male television actors
French National Academy of Dramatic Arts alumni
French male stage actors
Male actors from Paris
21st-century French male actors